Alikhanov is a Russian and Azerbaijani surname. Notable people with the surname include:

Abraham Alikhanov (1904–1970), Soviet Armenian nuclear physicist
Anton Alikhanov (born 1986), Russian politician and lawyer
Anvar Alikhanov (1917–1992), Azerbaijani politician
Maksud Alikhanov

Azerbaijani-language surnames
Russian-language surnames